Tropane alkaloids are a class of bicyclic [3.2.1] alkaloids and secondary metabolites that contain a tropane ring in their chemical structure. Tropane alkaloids occur naturally in many members of the plant family Solanaceae. Certain tropane alkaloids such as cocaine and scopolamine are notorious for their psychoactive effects, related usage and cultural associations. Particular tropane alkaloids such as these have pharmacological properties and can act as anticholinergics or stimulants.

Classification

Anticholinergics 
Anticholinergic drugs and deliriants:

 Atropine, racemic hyoscyamine, from the deadly nightshade (Atropa belladonna)
 Hyoscyamine, the levo-isomer of atropine, from henbane (Hyoscyamus niger), mandrake (Mandragora officinarum) and the sorcerers' tree (Latua pubiflora).
 Scopolamine, from henbane and Datura species (Jimson weed)

All three acetylcholine-inhibiting chemicals can also be found in the leaves, stems, and flowers in varying, unknown amounts in Brugmansia (angel trumpets), a relative of Datura.  The same is also true of many other plants belonging to subfamily Solanoideae of the Solanaceae, the alkaloids being concentrated particularly in the leaves and seeds. However, the concentration of alkaloids can vary greatly, even from leaf to leaf and seed to seed.

Stimulants
Stimulants and cocaine-related alkaloids:

 Cocaine, from coca plant (Erythroxylum coca)
 Ecgonine, a precursor and metabolite of cocaine
 Benzoylecgonine, a metabolite of cocaine
 Hydroxytropacocaine, from coca plant (Erythroxylum coca)
 Methylecgonine cinnamate, from coca plant (Erythroxylum coca)

Others 
 Catuabines, found in catuaba, an infusion or dry extract made from Erythroxylum vaccinifolium
 Scopine

Synthetic analogs of tropane alkaloids also exist, such as the phenyltropanes.  They are not considered to be alkaloids per definition.

Biosynthesis
The biosynthesis of the tropane alkaloids have attracted intense interest because of their high physiological activity as well as the presence of the bicyclic tropane core.

References

 
Deliriants